Capital & Regional plc is a large British manager of property assets - mainly shopping centres - for funds in which it has a significant stake.

History
The company was founded in 1979 as Capital & Regional Properties. It was floated on the Unlisted Securities Market in 1986. In 1993 it acquired the Trinity Shopping Centre in Aberdeen and in 1994 the Eldon Garden Shopping Centre in Newcastle upon Tyne. In 1997 it went on to buy the Sauchiehall Shopping Centre in Glasgow and in 1998 the Pallasades Shopping Centre in Birmingham.

In 2001 it established the Mall Fund and the Junction Fund with Morley Fund Management and in 2008 the company commenced negotiations for extra funding for the Mall Fund.

Structure
The company has two divisions:
 Earnings business - property management
 Assets business - fund investing

References

External links
 Capital & Regional corporate site

Property companies based in London
British companies established in 1979